Monca crispinus, the violet-patched skipper, is a species of grass skipper in the family of butterflies known as Hesperiidae. It is found in North and CentralAmerica.

The MONA or Hodges number for Monca crispinus is 3992.

References

Further reading

External links

 

Hesperiinae
Articles created by Qbugbot